Many films have been released to the public domain intentionally by the film's author, or because the copyright has expired.

Public domain film by country

Japan
Many pre-1954 Japanese films have passed into public domain in Japan. See Japanese Films copyright timeline.

United States

In the United States, motion pictures are copyrighted for 95 years. All motion pictures made and exhibited before  are indisputably in the public domain in the United States.

All copyrightable works made by United States government employees as part of their official duties are in the public domain from their creation. The status of works made by contractors is dependent on the terms of their contract. Note that this applies only to the federal government, and not to state or local governments, which may or may not claim copyright depending on state laws

Re-imposing copyright following Uruguay Round 
Another issue specifically affects copyright of foreign works in the United States. The Uruguay Round agreements on copyright led to the U.S. Congress re-imposing copyright on some items which had fallen into the public domain (in section 514 of the URAA Act), as of 1996.

In the course of changes made to both U.S. domestic law and international copyright agreements in the last two decades, some works which had fallen in the public domain had copyright restored in the U.S. This was challenged on the grounds that works once in the public domain could not revert to copyright protection - a constitutional question. The see-saw course of court decisions on the matter have caused confusion, with many significant works (such as The Third Man) changing status several times in a short period.

Specifically, from a holding published on 3 April 2009 to a reversal on 21 June 2010, re-imposition of copyright was not permitted. That brief period came after the 2001 American case Golan v. Gonzales was reconsidered in Golan v. Holder, which held that the "limited time" language of the United States Constitution's Copyright Clause does not preclude the extension of copyright protections to works previously in the public domain.

Initially, Judge Babcock held that the First Amendment was not applicable to resurrecting foreign copyright claims. This holding followed tradition in that the First Amendment (which protects against suppression of free speech by government) has always been held not to prevail against the earlier copyright clause (copyrights are generally held by persons, not the U.S. government). 
Subsequently, Babcock reversed himself on advice by a higher court that such an act by an arm of government (Congress) changed the traditional interpretation of copyright and should be subject to First Amendment scrutiny. That reversal was itself reversed on appeal and summary judgement granted for the government.
Babcock's holding - that "In the United States, that body of law includes the bedrock principle that works in the public domain remain in the public domain. Removing works from the public domain violated Plaintiffs’ vested First Amendment interests" - therefore no longer applies. Unless and until review is complete by SCOTUS, public domain works can have copyright re-imposed by international treaty and the First Amendment will not prevent it.

Note that restored, subtitled, and dubbed versions of films can themselves be subject to copyright, even if other elements of the film are in the public domain. Thus even if a film dates from 1915 and as such is ineligible for copyright in the United States of America, a 2004 version with new visual or audio elements (including the addition of a new recording of the score of a silent film) may be itself eligible for a 2004 copyright to those new elements. Special features and packaging are themselves subject to copyright protection.

The question of whether restored films like the most recent version of Metropolis can be copyrighted will not be clear until after the SCOTUS review is complete. That is because the SCOTUS review examines both the First Amendment issue, affecting a version which existed in 1996, and also the much more fundamental question whether Congress has the right to remove works from the public domain at all. There is also a legal question in the U.S. whether a restored print, as a copy of a public domain work, is not original - so does not qualify for copyright protection.

See also 

 List of films in the public domain in the United States
 List of countries' copyright length
 Public domain
 Public domain music
 Public Domain Day

References 

Articles containing video clips
Film
Public domain